Heino Bezuidenhout (born 13 March 1997) is a South African rugby union player. His regular position is outside centre in fifteens rugby and as a forward in sevens rugby.

Career

In 2015, he was named captain of the South Africa Rugby Sevens for the 2015 Commonwealth Youth Games.

The following year, he was selected in the  Varsity Cup squad.

He made his debut for the South Africa Sevens team at the 2018 Hong Kong Sevens, where South Africa finished third.

References

1997 births
Living people
South African rugby union players
South Africa international rugby sevens players
People from Roodepoort
Rugby union centres
Sportspeople from Gauteng